Arbel is a moshav in northern Israel. Located on Mount Arbel next to the Sea of Galilee near Tiberias, it falls under the jurisdiction of Lower Galilee Regional Council.

Arbel was established in 1949 by demobilized soldiers on the lands of the depopulated Arab-Palestinian village of Hittin. It was initially a moshav shitufi, but became a moshav ovdim in 1959.

History

Hellenistic, Roman and Byzantine "Arbel" or "Arbela"
In 161 BCE "Arbela" in the Arbel Valley was the site of a battle between the supporters of the Maccabees and Seleucid general Bacchides, who defeated and killed his opponents.

In the second half of the second century BCE, the village of Arbel was the home of the sage Nittai of Arbela.

In 38 BCE, Jewish partisans of Antigonus who were opposing Herod in his conquest of the land with the help of Roman, sought refuge from his troops in the caves dotting the steep northern cliffs of Mount Arbel, but couldn't escape death. Their story is told by Josephus, who himself fortified the cave-village as a storage base at the beginning of the First Jewish–Roman War against Rome in 66 CE.

The ancient town of Arbel is thought by some to have been located at the site of Khirbet Wadi Hamam ("Ruins [in the] Valley of the Doves"; Hurvat Vradim being the modern Hebrew name), on the other side of Arbel Valley, on the eastern slopes of Mount Nitay and close to the stream bed; if that was the case, the village only moved to the site of Khirbet Irbid, close to where the modern moshav stands now, during the Middle Ages.

Ceramics from the late Roman and Byzantine periods have been found.

Early Muslim "Irbil"
In 1047 CE, Nasir Khusraw was on a pilgrimage through Palestine, and noted that he came to the village of Irbil, after leaving Hittin, on his way to Tabariyyah. He further noted that "on the south side of [Irbil] rises a mountain; and on the mountain is an enclosure, which same contains four graves-those of the sons of Yacub (Jacob) - .[..] -who were brothers of Yusuff (Joseph) [..] And going onward I came to a hill, and below the hill a cavern, in which was the tomb of the mother of Moses."

Ottoman "Irbid", then "Khirbet Irbid"
In 1517, the village was incorporated into the Ottoman Empire with the rest of Palestine, and in 1596, Irbid appeared in Ottoman tax registers as being in  nahiya (subdistrict) of Tabariyya under the liwa' (district) of Safad.  It had a population of 2 households, both Muslims. They paid taxes on wheat, barley, summer crops, cotton, goats and/or beehives, olive oil press and/or a press for grape syrup.

The caves on the steep northern cliffs of Mount Arbel were refortified into a cave castle by Ali Beg, the son of 17th-century Druze ruler Fakhr ad-Din al-Maani.

In 1875, the French explorer Victor Guérin visited the ruins, and in 1881, the Palestine Exploration Fund's Survey of Western Palestine  found at "Kh. Irbid" "important ruins", with "traces of an Arab village".

Israeli "Moshav Arbel"
By 1948, the land  belonged to the Arab village of Hittin, which was depopulated in the 1948 Arab–Israeli War. Arbel was established in 1949 by demobilized soldiers. Initially a moshav shitufi (a more socialist-type moshav, closer to the kibbutz model), Arbel became a moshav ovdim in 1959.

Ancient synagogue

Arbel is notable for the ruins of an ancient synagogue, which stands amid the remnants of an ancient Jewish village on the western edge of the moshav. Archaeologists concluded that it was built in the fourth century CE, shows at least two construction phases, being rebuilt in the sixth century, and was probably used continuously until the eighth century, when a conflagration finally destroyed it - probably connected to the catastrophic 749 earthquake. The door of the synagogue, still standing, was carved from a massive natural outcropping of limestone, and the synagogue itself situated so as to make use of the stone as a handsome door. It is carved with decorative floral motifs and medallions. A carved groove for a mezuzah can be seen. Three sides of the building had carved stone benches. The two-storey building had three rows of columns with Corinthian capitals on the first floor and Ionic capitals on the second.

Notable residents
Shay Avital (born in 1952), Israeli Major General (Ret.) and former head of the Special Operations Forces Command

See also
Ancient synagogues in the Palestine region
Ancient synagogues in Israel
Archaeology of Israel

References

Bibliography

External links
Survey of Western Palestine, Map 6:  IAA, Wikimedia commons 

Moshavim
Populated places established in 1949
Archaeological sites in Israel
Former populated places in Southwest Asia
Ancient synagogues in the Land of Israel
Populated places in Northern District (Israel)
1949 establishments in Israel
Ancient Jewish settlements of Galilee
Sea of Galilee